Chalepus walshii is a species of leaf beetle in the family Chrysomelidae. It is found in North America.

Subspecies
These three subspecies belong to the species Chalepus walshii:
 Chalepus walshi walshi (Olivier, 1792)
 Chalepus walshii sayi Butte, 1968
 Chalepus walshii walshii (Crotch, 1873)

References

Further reading

 
 

Cassidinae
Articles created by Qbugbot
Beetles described in 1873